Won Ki-joon (born February 12, 1974) is a South Korean actor. He starred in television dramas such as Jumong (2006), Gourmet (2008), and Everybody Say Kimchi (2014).

Filmography

Television drama

Film

Variety show

Theater

Awards and nominations

References

External links
 
 
 
 

1974 births
Living people
South Korean male television actors
South Korean male film actors
South Korean male musical theatre actors
South Korean male stage actors
Hanyang University alumni